Taman Langit is the first studio album by the Indonesian band Peterpan. The album was released on January 6, 2003, through Musica Studios and has sold over 850,000 copies in Indonesia.

Noah version 

In 2012, Peterpan changed their name to Noah. Due to several reasons, such as wanting their old song to be released under Noah name, a desire to improve the recordings since some songs were not recorded the way they wished, and to properly adapt their old songs to digital format, Noah re-recorded their songs from Peterpan era. Noah's version of Taman Langit was released on December 17, 2021.

Track listing
All tracks are written by Ariel, except for "Sahabat" which is written by Ariel, Uki and Lukman and "Kita Tertawa" which is written by Ariel and Lukman.
 "Sahabat" (Best Friend) – 4:31
 "Aku & Bintang" (I and the Star) – 3:37
 "Semua Tentang Kita" (All About Us) – 4:25
 "Dan Hilang" (And Disappear) – 3:54
 "Satu Hati" (One Heart) – 4:28
 "Mimpi yang Sempurna" (The Perfect Dream)	 – 4:29
 "Taman Langit" (The Sky Garden) – 3:31
 "Yang Terdalam" (The Deepest) – 3:17
 "Tertinggalkan Waktu" (Left in Time) – 4:04
 "Kita Tertawa" (We Laugh) – 3:27
 "Topeng" (Mask) – 4:25

Personnel
Band
Ariel – vocals
Lukman – guitar
Uki – guitar
Indra – bass 
Andika – piano, keyboard
Reza – drums, percussion

Production
Noey, Capung – production

References

2003 debut albums
Indonesian-language albums
Noah (band) albums